Duck atadenovirus A (formerly Duck adenovirus A) is a species of hemagglutinating adenovirus implicated in egg drop syndrome.

Alternative names
The virus is or has been known by the following names:
 127 virus
 Group III avian adeno virus
 Egg drop syndrome virus
 Avian adenovirus EDS
 Eggdrop syndrome-1976 virus
 Adenovirus 127
 Duck adenovirus A
 Duck atadenovirus A

Strains
Strain 127 is the strain of the virus that was isolated and studied after the outbreak of egg drop syndrome 1976, and where the identification of the exact virus was first made.  The virus was first called Adenovirus 127 after this strain, before being named Duck adenovirus A. This strain was the first strain of the virus to get a full genome sequence in the GenBank database.  The virus was renamed Duck atadenovirus A in 2013.

Genome
The virus genome uses the standard genetic code.

Various complete genome sequences exist, including:

 Full genome of isolate FJ12025.
 Avian adenovirus EDS complete genome.

References

Adenoviridae